Omar Jorge (born 30 August 1956) is an Argentine former footballer who played as a defender.

Career
Jorge played club football in Argentina and Mexico for Vélez Sarsfield, Estudiantes Tecos, and Douglas Haig.

He earned two international caps for Argentina in 1983.

References

External links 
 

1956 births
Living people
Argentine footballers
Argentina international footballers
Club Atlético Vélez Sarsfield footballers
Tecos F.C. footballers
Club Atlético Douglas Haig players
Association football defenders
Argentine expatriate footballers
Argentine expatriate sportspeople in Mexico
Expatriate footballers in Mexico